Battiscombe is a surname. Notable people with the surname include:

Christopher Battiscombe (born 1940), British diplomat
Georgina Battiscombe (1905–2006), British biographer
Robert Battiscombe (1799–1881), English cricketer